Mackenzie Little (born 22 December 1996 in Rochester, Victoria) is an Australian female javelin thrower. She qualified for the 2020 Tokyo Olympics and came second in her Women's javelin throw qualification with a throw of 62.37m. Little could not match this distance in the final and came eighth with a distance of 59.96m, 6.38m less than the winner Liu Shiying of China.

Early years 
Mackenzie Little joined the Northern Suburbs Little Athletics as an Under-6. She loved playing many sports including soccer, softball, water polo and hockey. In Year 7 at Pymble Ladies College, she has her first javelin training session. This was only because her hurdles competition was cancelled.

Whilst a teenager, Little competed in the javelin and also 400m hurdles and heptathlon at a national level. At the age of 15 years old she was already throwing over 50 metres. In 2013 Little competed at the 2013 World Youth Championships in Ukraine. She won gold adding five metres to her personal best. In 2014 at 17 years of age she threw 57.60m,

Achievements
Little graduated in 2019 from Stanford University where she had studied a Bachelor of Science in Human Biology. During her time at the university she won two NCAA javelin titles and improved her best to 60.36m.

Back in Australia in 2019, Little commenced medicine at Sydney University and also made an excellent start to her 2020/21 season throwing a personal best of 61.42m and became the sixth-best in Australian history.

References

External links

1996 births
Living people
Australian female javelin throwers
Stanford Cardinal women's track and field athletes
Athletes (track and field) at the 2020 Summer Olympics
Olympic female javelin throwers
Olympic athletes of Australia
Athletes (track and field) at the 2022 Commonwealth Games
Commonwealth Games silver medallists for Australia
Commonwealth Games medallists in athletics
Medallists at the 2022 Commonwealth Games